Pontalete is a district of Três Pontas municipality in the south of Minas Gerais state, Brazil, located 23 km from the city. It is watered by Furnas Dam, being an important touristic destination. Its population is about 400 people.

Tourism
Pontalete has an artificial beach, being a destination to practice water sports. The region has many natural beauties.

Infrastructure
The district has paved streets, treated water and piped sewage, electric power, and many bars and restaurants. The crossing of Furnas Dam can be made by a way of a ferry.

References

External links
Pontalete no site da prefeitura de Três Pontas

Três Pontas